Konfederacja Narodu (Confederation of the Nation) was one of the Polish resistance organizations in occupied Poland during World War II. KN was created in 1940 by the far-right National Radical Camp Falanga (ONR-Falanga) political party from several smaller underground organizations, including the Secret Polish Army (TAP). In the political realm it was opposed to more centrist mainstream resistance organizations (SZP and ZWZ). It would never attract major support and would remain marginal, eventually partially merging with ZWZ around 1941 and finally joining Armia Krajowa around fall 1943.

References

1940 in Poland
Polish underground organisations during World War II
National radicalism